Rubin Hermann (born 26 January 1997) is a South African cricketer. He made his List A debut for Northerns in the 2016–17 CSA Provincial One-Day Challenge on 26 March 2017, scoring a century. He made his Twenty20 debut for Northerns in the 2017 Africa T20 Cup on 2 September 2017. He made his first-class debut for Northerns in the 2017–18 Sunfoil 3-Day Cup on 23 November 2017.

In September 2018, he was named in Northerns' squad for the 2018 Africa T20 Cup. In April 2021, he was named in Mpumalanga's squad, ahead of the 2021–22 cricket season in South Africa.

References

External links
 

1997 births
Living people
South African cricketers
Northerns cricketers
Place of birth missing (living people)